Bastiaen Jansz  Krol (also Sebastia(e)n Jans(s)en Crol or Crull; 1595, Harlingen – 14 March 1674) was Director of New Netherland from 1632 to 1633.

Early life
When he was 10, Krol's family moved from Friesland to Amsterdam and in 1623 he lived on the Bloemgracht. In that year he presented himself to church elders of the Dutch Reformed Church to be sent abroad as a "ziekentrooster" ("comforter of the sick").

New Netherland
On 25 January 1624 he sailed to New Netherland, where he arrived when Cornelius May just had become the first Director-General. In November 1624 he had returned to Amsterdam and made a report to the church elders, who gave him the right to perform baptisms and weddings in the new colony. He probably sailed back to New Amsterdam in May or June 1625, prior to the arrival of Peter Minuit the next year.

Bastiaen  Krol is most frequently remembered for arranging the purchase of the domain of Rensselaerswyck in 1630.  Kiliaen van Rensselaer was one of the first to ask for a grant of land. He received a tract of country to the north and south of Fort Orange, but not including that trading-post, which, like the island of Manhattan, remained under the control of the Dutch West India Company. By virtue of this grant and later purchases, van Rensselaer acquired a  tract comprising what are now the counties of Albany and Rensselaer with part of Columbia in the state of New York. 

Before and after his post as Director-General,  Krol was commander of Fort Orange. He returned to the Netherlands at least two more times. Between 1638 and 1643 he lived in New Netherland, but the last records of him are from September 1645 in "Old" Amsterdam.

Personal life
In 1615, he married Annetje Cristoffels in Amsterdam.

See also
 Colonial America
 Dutch colonization of the Americas
 Dutch Empire
 List of colonial governors of New Jersey
 List of colonial governors of New York

References
Notes

Further reading

 William Elliot Griffis The Story of New Netherland. The Dutch In America (Chapter VI.  The Riverside Press. Cambridge. 1909)
 Allen Johnson, Ed.  Dutch and English on the Hudson (Chapter IV . New Haven: Yale University Press. 1919)

1595 births
1640s deaths
American people of Dutch descent
People of the Province of New York
People from Harlingen, Netherlands
Directors of New Netherland